Daniel Dąbrowski (born 23 September 1983 in Łódź) is a Polish sprinter who specializes in the 400 metres and 4 × 400 metres relay.

Achievements

Personal bests
100 metres - 10.58 s (2006)
200 metres - 20.74 s (2006)
400 metres - 45.38 s (2006)

References
 

1983 births
Living people
Polish male sprinters
Sportspeople from Łódź
Athletes (track and field) at the 2008 Summer Olympics
Olympic athletes of Poland
World Athletics Championships medalists
European Athletics Championships medalists
Universiade medalists in athletics (track and field)
Śląsk Wrocław athletes
Universiade gold medalists for Poland
World Athletics Indoor Championships medalists
Medalists at the 2005 Summer Universiade
Medalists at the 2007 Summer Universiade
21st-century Polish people